is a Japanese badminton player.

Achievements

BWF International Challenge/Series 
Women's doubles

  BWF International Challenge tournament
  BWF International Series tournament
  BWF Future Series tournament

References

External links 
 

Japanese female badminton players
Living people
1997 births
Sportspeople from Ishikawa Prefecture
21st-century Japanese women